MicroWarehouse was the largest and longest established at the time, direct resellers of branded IT products and services to business in the United Kingdom. At the height of their industry dominance, Micro Warehouse had 3,500 employees in thirteen different countries.

By 2000, Micro Warehouse was the leading direct marketer and catalogue retailer of personal computer products, with worldwide sales of $2.6 billion. MicroWarehouse owned and operated the domain names Inmac.co.uk, MacWarehouse.co.uk and MicroWarehouse.co.uk. All three were online, web based, computer hardware and software retailers.

History
The company was originally co founded by Peter Godfrey, Felix Dennis and Bob Bartner in 1987, and was based in South Norwalk, Connecticut. After an initial public offering on December 10, 1992, the company paved the way for a variety of competitors. In the 1990s, Micro Warehouse acquired a large number of similar companies in Europe.

Companies were acquired in the United Kingdom, France, The Netherlands, Sweden and Finland. Inmac was also purchased, raising European sales to over $700 million. After growing to become the fifth largest catalogue company in the world and a dominant re seller for Apple, Microsoft, and many other hardware manufacturers and software publishers, a class action lawsuit distracted senior management for several years.

Jerry York, CFO who led turnarounds at IBM and Chrysler, was the chairman, president, and CEO. The Los Angeles buyout firm Freeman, Spogli, York, and a group of private investors including Michael Ovitz and Gary L. Wilson, spent $725 million to take Micro Warehouse private in February 2000. The leveraged buyout left the company burdened with $200 million in debt.

The company sold its North American operations to CDW Corporation just two and a half years later, on September 8, 2003, for $22 million. Micro Warehouse filed for Chapter 11 bankruptcy protection and York announced his resignation. The bankrupt company owed millions to its unsecured creditors. $17.9 million to Ingram Micro, $8.6 million to Hewlett-Packard, $3.1 million to Toshiba, and $2 million to IBM.  
 
MicroWarehouse, along with Equanet and MacWarehouse are the three brands owned by Dixons Retail plc. WHSU Inc. and WHSU International Inc. (together known as MicroWarehouse) was acquired by the DSGi on 4 June 2004. On 9 October 2003, MicroWarehouse filed bankruptcy, which ultimately led to purchase of the MicroWarehouse by the group.  When MicroWarehouse was acquired by the group, it became a division of PC World Business.

MacWarehouse closure
In June 2012, the MacWarehouse website was replaced by a simple banner that redirected you to the website for PC World Business.

References

External links
Company website

Consumer electronics retailers of the United Kingdom
Currys plc
Retail companies established in 1987
Retail companies disestablished in 2012